Jahanabad (also Romanized as Jahānābād; also known as Jahānshāhābād) is a village in Firuzabad Rural District, Firuzabad District, Selseleh County, Lorestan Province, Iran. At the 2006 census, its population was 125, in 24 families.

References 

Towns and villages in Selseleh County